Srinatha Kavi Sarvabhoumudu is a 1993 Telugu-language biographical film, based on the life of 15th century poet Srinatha, produced by Nandamuri Rama Krishna under Ramakrishna Horticultural Studios & Srimathi Movie Combines banner and directed by Bapu. It stars N. T. Rama Rao, Jayasudha, Rajendra Prasad  and music composed by K. V. Mahadevan. This is the final movie of legendary actor NTR and the debut of famous Telugu comedians A.V.S. and Gundu Sudarshan.

Plot 
Srinatha was born to Bhimamba and Marayya in 1365. He is respected as Kavi Sarvabhouma (King of poets) and is being patronized by many kings including the Kondavidu Reddys, Velamas of Rachakonda and Deva Raya II of the Vijayanagara Empire. Even though he is married, Srinatha is in awe of a woman's beauty and dedicates his poems in praise of their beauty. Srinatha dedicates a host of books to kings and enjoys a luxurious life. Srinatha works as a minister in the court of Pedakomati Vema Reddy of Kondaveedu. He manages to get his king's prestigious knife, Nandikanta Potaraju Katari, which was taken away by Lingamanedu, ruler of Devarakonda in return for his literary prowess. Srinatha marries another poet, Potana's sister Sridevi.

Cast 
 N. T. Rama Rao as Srinatha
 Jaya Sudha as Sridevi
 Rajendra Prasad as Raja Vallabha Devudu / Nala
 Satyanarayana as Gowda Dindima Bhattu
 Mikkilineni as Pedakomati Vema Reddy
 Gummadi
 Rallapalli as Kanamam Nagaiah
 A.V.S. as Tamil poet
 Gundu Sudarshan as Ganapati
 Raja as Yuvaraju
 Aamani as Damayanti
 Sindhuja as Special appearance
 Disco Shanti as item number

Soundtrack 

Music composed by K. V. Mahadevan. Lyrics were written by C. Narayana Reddy.  Music released on BEATS Audio Company.

References 

1993 films
Films directed by Bapu
Indian biographical films
Hindu devotional films
Films scored by K. V. Mahadevan
1990s Telugu-language films